The 2007 Coca-Cola GM was the 37th edition of the Greenlandic Men's Football Championship. The final round was held in Nuuk from August 6 to 11. It was won by Nagdlunguaq-48 for the tenth time in its history.

Qualifying stage

North Greenland
FC Malamuk qualified for the final Round.

Disko Bay
Nagdlunguaq-48 and Kugsak-45 qualified for the final Round.

Central Greenland
Kagssagssuk Maniitsoq qualified for the final Round.

NB B-67 Nuuk qualified for the final Round as hosts.

East Greenland
TM-62 qualified for the final Round.

South Greenland
Eqaluk-54 and Kissaviarsuk-33 qualified for the final Round.

Final round

Pool 1

Pool 2

Playoffs

Semi-finals

Seventh-place match

Fifth-place match

Third-place match

Final

See also
Football in Greenland
Football Association of Greenland
Greenland national football team
Greenlandic Men's Football Championship

References

Greenlandic Men's Football Championship seasons
Green
Green
Foot